Kyle Leonardus Walker-Peters (born 13 April 1997) is an English professional footballer who plays as a full-back for Premier League club Southampton and the England national team.

Personal life
Walker-Peters was born in Edmonton, London. His uncle Phil Walker was a professional footballer who played for Millwall and Charlton Athletic.

Club career

Tottenham Hotspur 
Walker-Peters signed for Tottenham Hotspur on 1 July 2013. In May 2015, he made his senior team debut in the post-season tour of Malaysia and Australia. In December 2015, he received Premier League Under-21 player of the month for Spurs. February 2017 saw Walker-Peters sign a new contract until 2019.

At the start of the 2017–18 season Walker-Peters made his full Premier League debut against Newcastle United helping to earn Tottenham a 2–0 away victory at St James' Park. Sky Sports went on to award him Man of the Match. On 28 February 2018, he scored his first goal for Tottenham in the 6–1 win against Rochdale in the fifth round FA Cup tie.

In the 2018–19 season, Walker-Peters made his first start of the season on 31 October 2017 in the EFL Cup tie against West Ham United that Tottenham won 3–1. He also had his first appearance in the Premier League this season as a substitute in game against Leicester City.

On 10 December 2018, Walker-Peters signed a new five-year contract with Tottenham following a contract signed earlier in May the same year. He made his first start in the Champions League in the group stage against Barcelona, and despite a moment of poor play that led to a Barcelona goal, he performed well to block a goal in the second half. The match ended 1–1, which sent Tottenham through into the knockout stage together with their opponents.

On 26 December 2018, Walker-Peters registered three assists during a 5–0 home win against Bournemouth, becoming the youngest player, aged 21 years and 257 days, to provide three assists in a Premier League game since Jermaine Pennant (aged 20 years and 227 days) made three in August 2003 for Leeds United against Middlesbrough.

Southampton

2019–20 season: Loan to Southampton 
On 29 January 2020, Walker-Peters joined fellow Premier League side Southampton on loan until the end of the season. Walker-Peters made his league debut on 15 February 2020 against Burnley which Southampton lost 2–1. Due to the COVID-19 pandemic that suspended the Premier League season, Walker-Peters would not play again for Southampton until their 3–0 victory against Norwich on 19 June 2020. Walker-Peters ended the season with ten appearances for Southampton.

2020–21 season: Permanent move to Southampton 
On 11 August 2020, he signed a permanent, five-year deal with the club for a reported fee of £12 million. On 12 September 2020, Walker-Peters started his first game since his permanent switch in a 1–0 defeat to Crystal Palace. He was initially shown a straight red card by referee Jon Moss, but after Moss reviewed the pitchside monitor the decision was downgraded to a yellow card. On 6 November 2020, Walker-Peters appeared in a 2–0 victory against Newcastle which sent Southampton to the summit of the English top flight for the first time since 1988.

On 25 January 2021, Southampton manager Ralph Hasenhüttl said that Walker-Peters had sustained a muscle injury. On 11 February 2021, Walker-Peters returned from injury and started in the FA Cup against Wolves which ended in a 2–0 victory. Walker-Peters ended the season with 35 appearances in all competitions.

2021–22 season 
On 2 August 2021, Southampton signed right-back Tino Livramento for £5 million, adding competition for Walker-Peters. With the addition of Livramento, Walker-Peters starred as a left-back during parts of the season. On 22 August 2021, Walker-Peters made his first appearance of the season in Southampton’s 1–1 draw with Manchester United after he replaced Romain Perraud. On 25 August 2021, Walker-Peters scored his first professional goal for Southampton in an 8–0 away victory against Newport County in the EFL Cup. It was their biggest away win in their history.

On 22 January 2022, Walker-Peters scored his first Premier League goal in a 1–1 draw against Manchester City.

2022–23 season
On 13 March 2023, Southampton said it was in touch with the police after defender Walker-Peters received racist abuse on social media following the team's goalless draw with Manchester United on 12 March.

International career
Born in England, Walker-Peters is of Jamaican descent. He was selected to take part in the 2017 FIFA U-20 World Cup by coach Paul Simpson. He played in five matches and the final in which he helped England to win a first World Cup since 1966.

On 21 March 2022, Walker-Peters earned his first call-up to the senior England squad for friendlies against Switzerland and the Ivory Coast. Five days later, he made his senior debut in a 2–1 victory against Switzerland.

Career statistics

International

Honours
Tottenham Hotspur
UEFA Champions League runner-up: 2018–19

England U20
FIFA U-20 World Cup: 2017

References

External links
Kyle Walker-Peters profile at the Tottenham Hotspur F.C. website
Kyle Walker-Peters profile at the Football Association website

1997 births
Living people
Footballers from Edmonton, London
English footballers
England international footballers
England youth international footballers
England under-21 international footballers
English people of Jamaican descent
Association football defenders
Tottenham Hotspur F.C. players
Southampton F.C. players
Premier League players
Black British sportsmen